Khoromkhon FC is a Mongolian professional football club from Ulaanbaatar. Khoromkhon competed in the Mongolian Premier League. They started playing under the name Heiniken in 2000, but changed their name to Khoromkhon in 2003.

History

Domestic history

Continental history

Honours
Mongolian Premier League: 2005, 2014
Mongolia Cup: 2012

References

Football clubs in Mongolia
1999 establishments in Mongolia
Association football clubs established in 1999